The 2007 West Berkshire Council election took place on 3 May 2007 to elect members of West Berkshire Council in Berkshire, England. The whole council was up for election and the Conservative Party stayed in overall control of the council.

Background
At the last election in 2003 both the Conservatives and Liberal Democrats won 26 seats and the Liberal Democrats kept control with the chairman's casting vote. However the Conservatives took control in May 2005 after gaining a seat from the Liberal Democrats at a by-election.

Election result
The Conservatives increased their majority to 20 seats after gaining seats from the Liberal Democrats. Conservative gains included taking seats in Clay Hill, Falkland and Thatcham Central wards to win 36 seats on the council, but they did lose one seat in Thatcham North to leave the Liberal Democrats on 16 seats. Overall turnout at the election improved to 45%.

Ward results

By-elections between 2007 and 2011

References

2007
2007 English local elections
2000s in Berkshire